This is a list of members of the South Australian House of Assembly from 1933 to 1938, as elected at the 1933 state election:

 The governing Labor Party had split into three separate factions prior to the 1933 state election due to disputes over the handling of the Great Depression. Robert Richards, the Labor Premier going into the election, had been expelled from the party along with much of the parliamentary caucus for supporting the Premiers' Plan. Richards and his supporters accordingly contested the election under the banner of the Parliamentary Labor Party. The official ALP, consisting of the party administration, several dissident MHAs and much of the party grassroots, ran a mostly new slate of candidates. A number of MHAs and party officials also formed a third faction, the Lang Labor Party, associated with the ideas of New South Wales Premier Jack Lang. All three factions won seats in the election.
 Two of the three Lang Labor Party MHAs, Bob Dale and Tom Howard left the party in 1933 after falling out with leader Doug Bardolph and formed their own party, the South Australian Lang Labor Party (SALLP).
 Barossa independent MHA Dr Herbert Basedow died on 4 June 1933. LCL candidate Reginald Rudall won the resulting by-election on 8 July.
 Alexandra LCL MHA George Laffer died on 7 December 1933. Independent candidate George Connor won the resulting by-election on 10 February 1934. 
 The four Labor factions reunited in June 1934 after an extended reconciliation process. All members of the four factions rejoined the official Labor Party as a result.
 Wooroora LCL MHA Archie Cameron resigned on 7 August 1934 in order to contest the federal seat of Barker at the 1934 federal election. Independent candidate Albert Robinson won the resulting by-election on 29 September.
 Adelaide MHA and former Lang Labor Party leader Doug Bardolph was expelled from the Labor Party in 1935. He served out the remainder of his term as an independent.
 Port Pirie Labor MHA John Fitzgerald died on 22 December 1936. Labor candidate William Threadgold was elected to the vacancy unopposed on 3 March 1937.

Members of South Australian parliaments by term
20th-century Australian politicians